Jil Kalmes (born 21 February 2000) is a Luxembourgish footballer who plays as a midfielder and has appeared for the Luxembourg women's national team.

Career
Kalmes has been capped for the Luxembourg national team, appearing for the team during the 2019 FIFA Women's World Cup qualifying cycle.

References

External links
 
 
 

2000 births
Living people
Luxembourgian women's footballers
Luxembourg women's international footballers
Women's association football midfielders